In rallying, a leg is usually each day of the event. For example, in 2005 each WRC event lasted over 3 legs - from Friday (1st Leg) over Saturday (2nd Leg) to Sunday (3rd Leg). 

A leg may also refer to a subset of stages within a single day of rallying usually broken up by a service or completion of a day. For example "The first leg of the day will consist of 5 stages covering just over 60km. Drivers will then have 45 minutes to resolve any issues with their vehicles before heading out to the second leg in which they'll cover another 4 stages of nearly equal distance, 58km, to complete the first day of the three day event."  

Rally racing